Uldine Mabelle Utley (March 16, 1912 – October 31, 1995) was an American Pentecostal child preacher.

Early life 
Utley was born in Durant, Oklahoma,  the daughter of Azle Herbert Utley and Hattie Ellen Bray Utley. Her father was an electrician, and a farmer and postmaster while the family lived in Colorado.

Preaching career 
Utley had a conversion experience in 1921, inspired by the preaching of Aimee Semple McPherson while she was living in Fresno, California. Within two years Utley was preaching across the United States, and at the age of fourteen she preached to a crowd of 14,000 people at Madison Square Garden. During Utley's appearances at the Chicago World's Fair in 1933, during a heatwave, her program was promoted as having "cooled air" and comfortable seats. 

In 1935, she was ordained by the Methodist Episcopal Church. Utley was called "the Joan of Arc of the modern religious world". She was also called a "second Billy Sunday" and, as a young woman, "the ingenue of evangelism" and "the Garbo of the pulpit".

Later life 
She married salesman Wilbur Eugene Langkop in 1938, but was committed to a mental hospital shortly after her marriage, and eventually divorced. (He remarried in 1945.) Utley spent the rest of her life in and out of mental institutions. She died in 1995, at the age of 83, in San Bernardino, California. A biography of Utley was published in 2016.

References

1912 births
1995 deaths
People from Durant, Oklahoma
American evangelists
Women evangelists
American Methodist clergy
20th-century American clergy